The following is a list of television stations in Slovenia. The channels are being broadcast in Slovenia and are sorted by regions of coverage and type of content the channels broadcast. The list does not contain internet-only television stations.

Analog television 
Television in Slovenia was first introduced in 1958. The first TV station in Slovenia was JRT TV Ljubljana 1 (now RTV Slovenija - TV Slovenija 1) in 1958. In 1970 JRT TV Ljubljana 2 (now TV Slovenija 2) was launched and TV Slovenija 3 in 2008. Colour television broadcasts began in 1976.

The first private TV station Kanal A was launched in May 1991, just about a month before the country's independence from Yugoslavia. The second private channel POP TV was launched by the company PRO PLUS d.o.o. in December 1995. TV3 was also launched in 1995, and was originally owned by the Roman Catholic Church. It had a poor viewership until Ivan Ćaleta, a businessman from Croatia, purchased 75% ownership of the channel in 2003, and started to offer more popular programming. Kanal A became the sister channel of POP TV in 2001, when Pro Plus took over the channel. TV3 became the new player on the market, when Swedish company MTG bought it in 2006. On 29 February 2012, it ceased broadcasting due to uncompetitive environment and unresponsiveness of Slovenian authorities.

Slovenia used the analogue PAL standard until December 1, 2010 when analog broadcasting ceased and was replaced with DVB-T.

List of TV stations in Slovenia

Public television channels

Radiotelevizija Slovenija
TV SLO 1
TV SLO 2
TV SLO 3

Regional
Televizija Koper
Televizija Maribor

Commercial television channels

Pro Plus
Pop
Kanal A
Brio
Kino
Oto
Astra

TV2 Csoport
Planet TV
Planet 2
Planet Eva

Other television channels
TV3
Nova24TV
Gold TV
Sport Klub
Šport TV
Arena Sport
Arena eSport
Boom TV
Adria TV
Folx TV
Net XXL
TV Veseljak
TV 8
TV Nakupi
Exodus TV

Regional television channels
Gorenjska televizija 
TV Celje
Vaš kanal
VTV

Local television channels with special status
ATV signal
RTS
TV Galeja

Regional and local television channels without special status
ePosavje
Ljubljana TV
Maxi TV
vŽivo.si
ETV
KTV Ormož
Koroška TV
Moj TV
Net TV
Play TV
TV AS
TV Kras
TV Krpan
TV Lep
TVM Miklavž
TV Medvode
Oron TV
TV Plus
TV Trbovlje
Vascom TV
ViTel
Go-TV
Savinjska televizija
TV Kočevje
TV Arena
Studio Bistrica
BK TV
STV
PeTV
ATM TV
Bled.TV
AK TV
TIPK TV
TV Uršlja
Tržič TV
Zdrava televizija
Zdravje TV

Television channels with nationwide coverage

Televizija Slovenija (public broadcaster RTV Slovenija)

Private television channels

Non-profit channels

Regional and local television stations

Regional channels, operated by RTV Slovenija

Regional television stations with special status

Local television stations with special status

Regional and local television stations without special status

DVB-T 
Experimental DVB-T broadcasts began in 2001 using the MPEG-2 standard. In 2007 the Slovenian government decided to test DVB-T transmission in Ljubljana using the MPEG-4 standard, following the approval of the APEK (Agency for Post and Telecommunications Republic of Slovenia), now AKOS (Agency for Communication Networks and Services).

After that Radiotelevizija Slovenija had to determine which transmitter would be used for the 3-month test. They settled on the transmitters made by a Slovene company, Elti, who produces analog and digital TV transmitters. After the test, the RTV SLO decided to expand transmissions to TV SLO 2. In 2008, the RTV SLO launched a new channel: TV SLO 3 (a public affairs channel) to its digital offering. High-definition broadcast with AC-3 was experimented during the Beijing 2008 olympic games. The 2010 Winter Olympic Games were also broadcast in HD.

Currently, there are two multiplexes operating, Mux A and Mux C.

Mux A
The operator is Radiotelevizija Slovenija. Mux A is intended for public programs.

Channels
 TV SLO 1 HD
 TV SLO 2 HD
 TV SLO 3 HD
 TV Maribor
 TV Koper - Capodistria
 Vaš kanal (in Lower Carniola, Upper Carniola, Central Slovenia, Lower Sava Valley and Central Sava Valley)

Mux C
Started on October 14, 2013. The operator is Radiotelevizija Slovenija. Mux C is intended for commercial programs. In January 2022, pay-TV channels, offered by the operator Innet TV were added.

Channels
 Golica TV
 Nova24TV
 Minimax (encrypted)
 Fox (encrypted)
 Fox Life (encrypted)
 Fox Crime (encrypted)
 Fox Movies (encrypted)
 Croatian Music Channel (CMC) (encrypted)
 National Geographic (encrypted)
 Viasat History (encrypted)
 TV 1000 (encrypted)
 AMC (encrypted)
 Obvestilo C

Local channels  
 Mux L1: ATV Signal (Litija)
 Mux L2: TV AS (Murska Sobota)
 Mux L4: VTV Velenje

Rating Shares (March 2018)

References

External links
 RTV Slovenia
 DVB-T in Slovenia